Rye is a hamlet in the civil parish of Odiham, in the Hart district of Hampshire, England. The hamlet lies near the A287 road between Odiham and Farnham. The hamlet is made up of a large farm and a common.

Hamlets in Hampshire
Odiham